Sarju Prasad Saroj is an Indian politician belonging to the Janata Dal.He was elected to the Lok Sabha the lower house of Indian Parliament from Mohanlalganj in Uttar Pradesh in 1989.

References

External links
 Official biographical sketch in Lok Sabha website

1942 births
2007 deaths
India MPs 1989–1991
Lok Sabha members from Uttar Pradesh
Janata Dal politicians
People from Pratapgarh district, Uttar Pradesh
People from Lucknow district